Al Ummah is a  terrorist organisation mainly based in Indian state of Tamil Nadu. It was banned by the Government of Tamil Nadu for perpetrating the 1998 Coimbatore bombings.

History
Al Ummah was founded by Syed Ahmed Basha in Coimbatore, Tamil Nadu in 1993, a year after the Babri Masjid demolition. It came under the spotlight after 1993 bomb blast near RSS office in Chennai in which 11 persons were killed.
In 1995, the organisation was involved with throwing home-made bombs at Mani Ratnam's house for portraying romance of a Hindu man with a Muslim woman in his film Bombay. Basha and others were arrested under Terrorist and Disruptive Activities (Prevention) Act but they were released in 1997. In 1998, Al Ummah was planning to assassinate Bharatiya Janata Party leader L. K. Advani during the election campaign in Coimbatore. Advani, however, eventually escaped due to a delay in his flight. But in the serial bomb blasts in 18 places, 58 persons were killed. In 2013, Al Ummah also was involved in the bomb blast in Bangalore.

References 

Islamic organisations based in India
Islamic terrorism in India
1993 establishments in Tamil Nadu
Organizations established in 1993